, stylized as ROUND1, is a Japan-based amusement store chain. In Japan, the amusement centers offer bowling alleys, arcade games, karaoke, and billiards. They also have a larger variation of Round One known as SpoCha, abbreviated for Sports Challenge, that offers a variety of items and indoor/outdoor activities such as batting cages, basketball, volleyball, tennis, futsal, driving range, etc. Round One Entertainment Inc. is an American subsidiary of Round One Corporation, the amusement centers in the U.S. offer a variety of bowling, karaoke, video game arcade cabinets and redemption games, billiards, darts, and ping pong while serving a variety of food and beverages.

History 
On December 25, 1980, the owner, Masahiko Sugino, founded a company called Sugino Kosan that featured a roller skate facility with arcade games. A few years later, the facility expanded to include a bowling alley which became very popular. This company later became the first Round One arcade in 1993. Since then, the company quickly expanded all across Japan.

Before 2010, the company first attempted to expand to the United States, when the company established Round One U.S.A. Corp, but after not finding a good location for their first overseas location, this subsidiary closed down in July 2006, the subsidiary was relaunched in 2008 as Round One Entertainment Inc., and successfully opened up a Round One-branded location at Puente Hills Mall in City of Industry, California in 2010.

In Japan, there are currently 107 stores open.

In the U.S., there are currently stores open in Arizona, California, Colorado, Florida, Georgia, Illinois, Kansas, Kentucky, Maine, Maryland, Massachusetts, Michigan, Nebraska, Nevada, New Jersey, New York, New Mexico, North Carolina, Ohio, Oklahoma, Oregon, Pennsylvania, Texas, Utah, Virginia,  Washington, and Wisconsin. More locations are planned to open in Indiana, and South Carolina. As of 2019, Round 1 plans to expand at a rate of 10 stores per year.

The brand also plans to open stores in Asia-Pacific region including Russia and China.

Arcade games
In addition to American arcade games, Round One locations in the United States offer many exclusive Japanese arcade games, which is something that other arcades rarely or cannot offer. These include beatmania IIDX 29: CastHour, Dance Dance Revolution A3, Sound Voltex EXCEED GEAR, Groove Coaster, Wangan Midnight Maximum Tune 5 (addressed as Maximum Tune 5 for its American release), and Initial D Arcade Stage 8. They also exclusively offer the special 20th anniversary golden cabinet for Dance Dance Revolution A20 PLUS. Round One and Dave & Buster's are the only two entertainment centers in the United States that have e-AMUSEMENT, an online service integrated into some Konami arcade games.

References

External links 
 【ラウンドワン】スポーツからリラクゼーションまで複合エンターテインメント空間「ラウンドワン」 Official Website (Japan)
 Round One Entertainment Inc. | Round1 is a state-of-the-art entertainment company offering fun the whole family can enjoy. Official Website (USA)

Entertainment companies established in 1980
Japanese companies established in 1980
Amusement companies of Japan
Companies based in Osaka Prefecture
Companies listed on the Tokyo Stock Exchange